The 1991 Georgia Southern Eagles football team represented Georgia Southern University as an independent during the 1991 NCAA Division I-AA football season. Led by second-year head coach Tim Stowers, the Eagles compiled a record of 7–4. They played their home games at Paulson Stadium in Statesboro, Georgia.

Schedule

References

Georgia Southern
Georgia Southern Eagles football seasons
Georgia Southern Eagles football